A Judgement in Stone is a 1977 novel by British writer Ruth Rendell, widely considered to be one of her greatest works.

Plot summary
Eunice is taken on as a housekeeper by a family of four.  She has kept her illiteracy a secret and is obsessed by continuing to keep it so.  Unknown to her new employers, she has already murdered the father for whom she had been caring, and has falsified her references.  Her inability to adapt to her place in society is masked by the cunning with which she conceals the truth about herself.  Misinterpreting every act of kindness she is offered by her employers, she eventually turns on them, stealing the guns that are normally kept locked away.  With the aid of a fellow social misfit, she murders the entire family.  But Eunice's illiteracy prevents her from recognizing and disposing of a written clue that was left behind.  Eventually a tape recording of the shooting made by one of the victims is discovered.  Eunice is charged with the crime, and is mortified when her illiteracy is revealed to the world during the court proceedings.

Film, TV or theatrical adaptations
The novel was filmed twice: The Housekeeper (1986) starred Rita Tushingham as the illiterate maid, and La Cérémonie (1995), directed by Claude Chabrol, starred Sandrine Bonnaire in the same role. The author has said that Chabrol's version is one of the few film adaptations of her work that she is happy with. The second adaptation has been lauded as an "instant classic" and a "masterpiece".

Release details
1997, UK, Hutchinson, Pub date 2 May 1977, hardback (First edition)

References

External links
 Ruth Rendell discusses A Judgement in Stone on the BBC World Book Club
 Ruth Rendell on Gusworld.com.au

1977 British novels
Fictional maids
Novels by Ruth Rendell
British novels adapted into films
Hutchinson (publisher) books